Chuo Highway Bus may refer to:
Chūō Kōsoku Bus (中央高速バス) of Keio Bus
Chūō-dō Kōsoku Bus (中央道高速バス) of Meitetsu Bus
Chūō Liner (bus) (中央ライナー) of JR Bus